Yousri Bouzok (Arabic: يسري بوزوق; born August 18, 1996, in Constantine, Algeria) is an Algerian professional footballer who plays as a winger for Raja Club Athletic.

Club career
Yousri Bouzok made his Algerian Ligue Professionnelle 1 debut on September 7, 2017, as a starter with Paradou AC in a 1-0 win against MC Oran.

On 31 July 2022, he signed a three-season contract with Raja CA and became the fourth Algerian player of the club's squad with Gaya Merbah, Raouf Benguit and Mehdi Boukassi.

References

External links
 

1996 births
Algerian footballers
Algerian Ligue Professionnelle 1 players
Algerian Ligue 2 players
Living people
Paradou AC players
Raja CA players
People from Constantine, Algeria